P. Vallalperuman was an Indian politician and former Member of Parliament elected from Tamil Nadu. He was elected to the Lok Sabha from Chidambaram constituency as an Indian National Congress candidate in 1984, 1989 and 1991 elections. He died at the age of 67 in November 2017 from a heart illness.

References 

20th-century births
2017 deaths
Indian National Congress politicians from Tamil Nadu
India MPs 1984–1989
India MPs 1989–1991
India MPs 1991–1996
Lok Sabha members from Tamil Nadu
People from Cuddalore district